Tlobzoda is a rural locality (a selo) in Khidibsky Selsoviet, Tlyaratinsky District, Republic of Dagestan, Russia. The population was 76 as of 2010.

Geography 
Tlobzoda is located 18 km north of Tlyarata (the district's administrative centre) by road. Khidib and Anada are the nearest rural localities.

References 

Rural localities in Tlyaratinsky District